Kachhla is a town and a nagar panchayat in Badaun district in the Indian state of Uttar Pradesh.

Demographics
 India census, Kachhla had a population of 9471. Males constitute 54% of the population and females 46%. Kachhla has an average literacy rate of 37%, lower than the national average of 59.5%: male literacy is 46%, and female literacy is 27%. In Kachhla, 19% of the population is under 6 years of age.

References

Cities and towns in Budaun district